Werner Belkircher was an Italian luger who competed in the mid-1970s. A natural track luger, he won the silver medal in the men's singles event at the 1977 FIL European Luge Natural Track Championships in Seis am Schlern, Italy.

References
Natural track European Championships results 1970-2006.

Italian male lugers
Italian lugers
Year of birth missing (living people)
Living people
Sportspeople from Südtirol